Stroke of Genius is the seventh studio album by American R&B singer Gerald Levert. It was released by Elektra Records on October 21, 2003, in the United States.

Critical reception

In his review for AllMusic, David Jeffries found that Stroke of Genius "is one of the best arguments yet that Gerald LeVert needs to slow down his release schedule and trust someone else in the producer's chair for once. After 1998's Love & Consequences, Levert fell into a rut, releasing one underwhelming album after another. His voice is fine and he still does the convincing pillow talk, but like his last few releases, the material isn't there. Too often he turns to R. Kelly-styled strip-club music way beyond his reach, with the embarrassing "Knock, Knock, Knock" being the worst offender."

Track listing 

Sample credits
"Stroke of Genius" contains elements of "I'm Gonna Love You Just a Little More Baby" as written and performed by Barry White.

Charts

Weekly charts

Year-end charts

References

2003 albums
Gerald Levert albums